Guillermo Huízar Carranza (born 25 June 1961) is a Mexican politician affiliated with the Party of the Democratic Revolution. As of 2014 he served as Deputy of the LIX Legislature of the Mexican Congress representing Zacatecas.

References

1961 births
Living people
Politicians from Fresnillo, Zacatecas
Party of the Democratic Revolution politicians
Autonomous University of Zacatecas alumni
21st-century Mexican politicians
Deputies of the LIX Legislature of Mexico
Members of the Chamber of Deputies (Mexico) for Zacatecas